The siege of Bouchain (1 October – 19 October 1712), was a siege of the War of the Spanish Succession, and a victory for the French troops of the Duc de Villars. A French army of 20,000 men besieged and captured the Allied-controlled fortifications after an 18-day siege, with the 2,000-strong Dutch-Imperial garrison under Major-General Grovenstein capitulating on 19 October.

Prelude
The allies had captured Bouchain from French forces the previous year after a 34 day siege, ending on 12 September 1711. 

Having taken advantage of the overstretched Allied lines of communications by crushing a Dutch-Imperial detachment at Denain in July 1712, the French Marshal Villars' army captured the forts of Marchiennes, Douai and Le Quesnoy over the next three months. Displaying great energy, Villars' advance guard besieged Bouchain on 1 October even before the French siege of Le Quesnoy was complete on 4 October. Villars and Louis XIV decided to conduct a siege instead of a blockade, to spare their troops the discomfort and because cutting off the water-logged town would be too difficult. Villars wrote

Siege
French provincial intendants provided the French army with siege material and peasant workers. The Allied garrison had 23 guns, 2 mortars and 2 swivel guns, while the French besiegers had 40 artillery pieces. The French approach on the left was slowed by Allied countermines that forced the French to sap the counterscarp. Eight grenadier companies stormed and captured the covered way on the right at the cost of 18 killed and 100 wounded. Thanks to the protection provided by sapping, the French troops on the left lost only 12–15 men while making their attack on the covered way. Villars was aware of the heavy casualties caused by assaults only lightly supported by artillery fire and without preparatory sapping, but judged the increased speed worth it against the protestations of his engineers. The French also made use of a feint attack to distract the garrison and constructed only two trench parallels instead of Vauban's recommended three.

Aftermath
Villars' victory nullified the Duke of Marlborough's conquest of Bouchain a year earlier and concluded the Anglo-Dutch portion of the war in the Treaty of Utrecht on terms that kept the fortified zone constructed by Vauban in northern France under French control.

Casualties
The French lost 400 killed and wounded (2% of their force). The Allied garrison was taken prisoner.

Citations

References

 
  
  

Siege of Bouchain
Sieges involving France
Sieges involving the Dutch Republic
Battles of the War of the Spanish Succession
1712 in France
Battles in Hauts-de-France
History of Nord (French department)